Frank Stronach  (born 6 September 1932) is an Austrian and Canadian businessman and politician.

He is the founder of Magna International, an international automotive parts company based in Aurora, Ontario, Canada, Granite Real Estate, and The Stronach Group. With an estimated net worth of $CAD 3.06 billion (as of December 2017), Stronach was ranked by Canadian Business as the 31st Richest Canadian.

In 2011, he entered Austrian politics: founding the Stronach Institute to campaign for classical liberalism and against the euro. In 2012, he founded the political party Team Stronach for Austria.

Early life and family
Of Croatian heritage he was born as Franz Strohsack in Kleinsemmering, Styria, Austria, to working-class parents, Stronach's childhood was marked by the Great Depression and the Second World War. At age 14, he left school to apprentice as a tool and die maker. In 1954, he arrived in Montreal, Quebec, and later moved to Ontario.

Family
He married Elfriede Sallmutter, a fellow Austrian. They have two children: Belinda Stronach, a former Liberal (and previously Conservative) MP and former CEO of Magna, and Andrew Stronach, who is involved in thoroughbred horse racing,  via the Adena Springs Farms breeding operations. He divides his time between Oberwaltersdorf, Austria, and Aurora, Ontario. 

Frank and Elfriede Stronach have three grandchildren, Frank Walker and Nicole Walker who are Belinda Stronach’s children and Selena Stronach who is Andrew Stronach’s only child.

Business career
In 1956, Stronach started his first business, Multimatic Investments Ltd., in the old manufacturing district of Toronto. In 1969, his firm acquired its first automotive parts contract and merged with Magna Electronics. In 1973, the name was converted from Multimatic Investments Ltd to Magna International Ltd.

Stronach, who is currently the non-executive chairman of Magna International, holds multiple-voting shares of the company, which gives him majority voting power over issues brought to shareholder vote. Although he controls the voting power among Magna's shareholders, Stronach owns only 4% of Magna's equity. His pay packages over the past few years have been between $30 and 50 million CAD.  In October 2018, he sued the Stronach Group.

On 1 October 2018, he and his wife filed a lawsuit against their daughter Belinda, their grandchildren Nicole and Frank Walker, and Alon Ossip for failure to honour commitments regarding the management of The Stronach Group (TSG), from which Frank Stronach resigned as trustee in 2013 when he ran for office in Austria.[4] The settlement to the lawsuit was announced on August 13, 2020.  As part of the settlement, Frank and Elfriede will assume full control and ownership of a stallion and breeding business, all farm operations in North America, and all European assets. Belinda Stronach retains full control of The Stronach Group’s horse racing, gaming, real estate and related assets.

Activities in Austria
In 1986, Stronach founded Magna Europa, with headquarters in Oberwaltersdorf, Lower Austria. He started to become a notable figure also in the Austrian public in the late 1990s. In 1997, he announced the project to build an amusement park in Ebreichsdorf, which would have included a giant globe representing the Earth that would have been 110 m high and visible from every point in the Viennese Basin. The project failed due to several public opposition. 

In 1998, Magna took over Steyr-Daimler-Puch. In the newly merged company Magna Steyr, he successfully prevented the establishment of works councils, in violation of Austrian labour law by reprimanding workers who were cooperating with unions. In 2003, Stronach also planned to take over VOEST, but this project failed. In 2004, a leisure center and the show jumping site Magna Racino were inaugurated at Ebreichsdorf.

Thoroughbred horse racing
In 2011, Stronach along with his daughter Belinda Stronach, founded The Stronach Group, a horse racing, entertainment and pari-mutuel wagering technology company. The Stronach Group horse racing industry brands include; Santa Anita Park, "The Great Race Place"; Pimlico Race Course, home of the Preakness Stakes; Gulfstream Park, one of Florida's entertainment destination centers, and home to the $16-million Pegasus World Cup Invitational, the world's richest Thoroughbred horse race; Laurel Park; Golden Gate Fields; Portland Meadows; and Rosecroft Raceway. The Stronach Group is in pari-mutuel technology through its subsidiaries AmTote and Xpressbet and is a distributor of horse racing content to audiences through Monarch Content Management.  A settlement to the lawsuit launched by Stronach on October 1, 2018 was announced on August 13, 2020. As part of the settlement, Stronach assumes full control and ownership of a stallion and breeding business, all farm operations in North America, and all European assets while Belinda Stronach retains full control of The Stronach Group’s horse racing, gaming, real estate and related assets. Stronach no longer plays a role in The Stronach Group.

Among his early successes was his partnership with Nelson Bunker Hunt in the filly Glorious Song who was voted the 1980 Sovereign Award for Canadian Horse of the Year.

His horses have won the Queen's Plate in 1994 and 1997, the Belmont Stakes in 1997, and the Preakness Stakes in 2000. His horse Ghostzapper won several major races including the 2004 Breeders' Cup Classic, was voted the Eclipse Award for Horse of the Year, and named  the World's Top Ranked Horse for 2004. In Canada, Stronach and/or his Stronach Stables has won the Sovereign Award for Outstanding Owner nine times. In the United States, he earned the Eclipse Award for Outstanding Owner in 1998, 1999, and 2000. In 2000, he won the Eclipse Award for Outstanding Breeder. He subsequently established Adena Springs Farms which owns horse breeding farms in Kentucky, Florida and Canada and won the Eclipse Award for Outstanding Breeder in 2004, 2005 and 2006.

Politics

Canadian politics
Stronach was a candidate of the Liberal Party of Canada in the 1988 federal election for the riding of York—Simcoe, but was defeated by the Progressive Conservative John Cole. Magna International has also been noted for its connections to the Ontario PC Party and the Ontario Liberal Party. 

These connections were most famously exhibited when Progressive Conservative Premier Ernie Eves and Finance Minister Janet Ecker delivered the 2003 Ontario budget from a Magna plant. This led to accusations that the government was violating centuries of parliamentary tradition, and is generally believed to have had a negative impact on the Progressive Conservatives in the next provincial election.

Austrian politics
In 2011, Stronach entered Austrian politics, proposing the establishment of a new political party: a "Citizens' Alliance" advocating tax, health, and education reform. In November 2011, he called for an 'intellectual revolution' in Austria, suggesting that he would be willing to fund a student-led political party.

Stronach's plans to form a new party gained prominence in 2012. He called for a flat tax of 20%, a reduction in bureaucracy by 10% over five years, and a balanced budget. Stronach argued that Austria should stay in the EU, but that the euro being a 'monstrosity'.

His programme was compared to the Alliance for the Future of Austria (BZÖ); Stronach had admired the BZÖ's leader Josef Bucher as the only politician in Austria that represented economic liberalism. This led to suggestions that Stronach would take over the BZÖ ahead of the 2013 elections so as to give his movement seats in Parliament.

The new party, called Team Stronach, was launched in September 2012. Four MPs – Gerhard Köfer of the Social Democratic Party, Elisabeth Kaufmann-Bruckberger of the BZÖ and independents Robert Lugar and Erich Tadler agreed to join the party. The endorsement of at least three members of the National Council was required for a party to compete in general elections (alternatively, a quorum of 2,600 signatures in support of the party's candidacy have to be collected).

Stronach campaigned for the party, but did not lead it. It took part in the 2013 national election and won 11 seats. Stronach got one seat and therefore became a member of the Austrian parliament, but by 2014 he had passed his seat on. The party dissolved in 2017, before the next election.

Football
Stronach is also interested in football (soccer). He was the main sponsor of FK Austria Vienna from 1999 until 2005. In spite of a budget three times larger than its closest competitors and the fact that Stronach was at the same time the president of the Austrian Bundesliga, the club managed to win the Austrian Championship only twice. Due to opposition among prominent members of FK Austria Wien, Stronach decided on 21 November 2005 to withdraw from the club. On 24 November 2005, he decided not to seek re-election as president of the Austrian Bundesliga.

Stronach also founded the Frank Stronach Football Academy in Hollabrunn to train and educate adolescent players. The academy was closed in 2009.

Hurricane Katrina
On 6 September 2005, Stronach announced that he and Magna International were committing $2 million to start a model community for people displaced by Hurricane Katrina. The Toronto Star reported that "Magna Entertainment Corp. is [currently] providing housing for about 260 evacuees from the New Orleans area at a racetrack training facility in Palm Beach County, Florida and will move them to a new community in November. "[W]e would like to build a small community where we would try to be sponsors for the next five to seven years", Stronach said in an interview with The Star. Further details were announced on 6 October 2005, and that the new development would be officially known as Magnaville. Later the name Canadaville was adopted.

Honours
In 1999, Stronach was made a member of the Order of Canada. In December 1997, Stronach was awarded an honorary Doctor of Engineering by Kettering University.

References

1932 births
Living people
20th-century Austrian businesspeople
20th-century Canadian businesspeople
21st-century Austrian politicians
21st-century Canadian politicians
Austrian billionaires
Austrian chief executives
Austrian company founders
Austrian emigrants to Canada
Austrian philanthropists
Businesspeople from Ontario
Canadian billionaires
Canadian chief executives
Canadian company founders
Canadian Horse Racing Hall of Fame inductees
Canadian philanthropists
Canadian racehorse owners and breeders
Candidates in the 1988 Canadian federal election
Eclipse Award winners
Liberal Party of Canada candidates for the Canadian House of Commons
Magna International
Members of the Order of Canada
People from Aurora, Ontario
People from Weiz District
Owners of King's Plate winners